Eden Valley is a city in Meeker and Stearns counties in the U.S. state of Minnesota.  The population was 1,042 at the 2010 census.  Most of Eden Valley is in Meeker County; the Stearns County portion is part of the St. Cloud Metropolitan Statistical Area.

History

Eden Valley was platted in 1886. A post office has been in operation at Eden Valley since 1887.

Geography

Minnesota State Highways 22 and 55 are two of the main routes in the community.

Demographics

2010 census
As of the census of 2010, there were 1,042 people, 434 households, and 262 families living in the city. The racial makeup of the city was 96.2% White, 0.4% African American, 0.6% Native American, 0.1% Asian, 0.6% from other races, and 2.2% from two or more races. Hispanic or Latino of any race were 3.2% of the population.

There were 434 households, of which 32.7% had children under the age of 18 living with them, 41.9% were married couples living together, 13.4% had a female householder with no husband present, 5.1% had a male householder with no wife present, and 39.6% were non-families. 33.2% of all households were made up of individuals, and 12.9% had someone living alone who was 65 years of age or older. The average household size was 2.40 and the average family size was 3.01.

The median age in the city was 34.5 years. 27.4% of residents were under the age of 18; 7.5% were between the ages of 18 and 24; 28.8% were from 25 to 44; 21% were from 45 to 64; and 15.4% were 65 years of age or older. The gender makeup of the city was 51.1% male and 48.9% female.

2000 census
As of the census of 2000, there were 866 people, 360 households, and 221 families living in the city. The racial makeup of the city was 97.81% White, 0.69% African American, 0.35% Native American, 0.58% Asian, 0.58% from other races. Hispanic or Latino of any race were 1.96% of the population.

There were 360 households, out of which 28.9% had children under the age of 18 living with them, 45.0% were married couples living together, 11.1% had a female householder with no husband present, and 38.6% were non-families. 32.5% of all households were made up of individuals, and 16.7% had someone living alone who was 65 years of age or older.  The average household size was 2.37 and the average family size was 3.01.

In the city, the population was spread out, with 25.1% under the age of 18, 13.0% from 18 to 24, 26.1% from 25 to 44, 15.5% from 45 to 64, and 20.3% who were 65 years of age or older.  The median age was 34 years. For every 100 females, there were 95.9 males.  For every 100 females age 18 and over, there were 97.3 males.

The median income for a household in the city was $25,781, and the median income for a family was $39,125. Males had a median income of $29,107 versus $20,227 for females. The per capita income for the city was $13,501.  About 9.1% of families and 14.8% of the population were below the poverty line, including 14.2% of those under age 18 and 23.3% of those age 65 or over.

References

External links
Eden Valley – Watkins Schools site

 

Cities in Minnesota
Cities in Stearns County, Minnesota
Cities in Meeker County, Minnesota
St. Cloud, Minnesota metropolitan area